Shashi Panja is a medical practitioner and politician who currently serves as Cabinet Minister for Industries, Commerce & Enterprises and Department of Women and Child Development and Social Welfare of the Government of West Bengal.

Early life
Panja born in Telugu(తెలుగు) family to Krishnayya (immigrated from Andhra) in Calcutta. She did her MBBS from R. G. Kar Medical College and Hospital at Kolkata, with specialisation in ultrasound and infertility practice. She married Dr. Prasun Kumar Panja, son of the veteran politician Ajit Kumar Panja.

Political career
Panja was elected a councillor of Kolkata Municipal Corporation in 2010 and was appointed mayoral council member in charge of education.

She was elected to the West Bengal State Assembly from Shyampukur (Vidhan Sabha constituency) in 2011 and re-elected in 2016 and 2021 from same constituency.

She was inducted into the Council of Ministers of West Bengal as a minister of state and given independent charge of the women & child welfare ministry in December 2013. In May 2014, she was given additional charge of the social welfare department.

In 2021 she was sworn in as the cabinet minister as a part of the 21st Council of Ministers for the state of West Bengal under the leadership of Mamata Banerjee with the portfolios of Department of Women and Child Development and Social Welfare.

References

1963 births
Trinamool Congress politicians from West Bengal
Women in West Bengal politics
Living people
West Bengal MLAs 2011–2016
Politicians from Kolkata
21st-century Indian women politicians
21st-century Indian politicians
West Bengal MLAs 2016–2021